Vladimir Aleksandrovich Romanenko (born 30 September 1987) is a Russian former professional footballer.

Club career
He played 13 seasons in the Russian Football National League for 10 different clubs.

External links
 
 

1987 births
Sportspeople from Saratov
Living people
Russian footballers
FC KAMAZ Naberezhnye Chelny players
FC Salyut Belgorod players
FC Sokol Saratov players
FC Khimki players
FC Volgar Astrakhan players
FC Luch Vladivostok players
FC Tosno players
FC Rotor Volgograd players
FC Armavir players
FC Tekstilshchik Ivanovo players
Association football midfielders
Association football forwards